Victoria Folayan (born May 27, 1985) is an American rugby sevens player. She was selected as a member of the United States women's national rugby sevens team to the 2016 Summer Olympics. She was in the squad for the 2013 Rugby World Cup Sevens in Russia.

She graduated from Stanford University, where she studied psychology and drama. She was named 2013 Women's 7s Player of the Year by RugbyMag.

References

External links 
 Victoria (Vix) Folayan at USA Rugby
 

1985 births
Living people
United States international rugby sevens players
Female rugby sevens players
American female rugby sevens players
Rugby sevens players at the 2016 Summer Olympics
Olympic rugby sevens players of the United States
Stanford University alumni